Jordan Staal (born September 10, 1988) is a Canadian professional ice hockey centre and captain of the Carolina Hurricanes of the National Hockey League (NHL). He is regarded as a premier penalty-killer, both for his strong defensive skills and ability to score and set up shorthanded goals. In 2007, he became the youngest player (18 years and 153 days) to score a hat trick in league history.

Staal grew up playing minor hockey for the Thunder Bay Kings AAA organization. After his minor midget year, Staal was selected in the first round (2nd overall) by the Peterborough Petes. He was the second Staal in the NHL, after older brother Eric was drafted second overall in the 2003 NHL Entry Draft. After a two-year Ontario Hockey League (OHL) career, in which he won a J. Ross Robertson Cup and appeared in the 2006 Memorial Cup with the Peterborough Petes, Staal was drafted second overall by the Pittsburgh Penguins in the 2006 NHL Entry Draft. He made the immediate jump from junior to the NHL after being drafted and set several NHL records in his rookie season, including youngest player to score on a penalty shot, to score two shorthanded goals in one game, to score a hat trick and the most shorthanded goals by a rookie in one season. Staal was also a Calder Memorial Trophy nominee and was named to the NHL All-Rookie Team.

Among his former Penguins teammates, Staal was known as "Gronk." The nickname, a reference to a Marvel comic book supervillain, was given to him by former Penguins teammate Colby Armstrong, because of his strong on-ice presence. Staal won the Stanley Cup as a member of the Penguins in 2009, scoring two goals and an assist in the seven-game series against the Detroit Red Wings. One year prior, he lost the 2008 finals against the same Red Wings.

Jordan Staal is one of the four Staal brothers, whom have all played or are currently playing professional hockey in the NHL. The eldest, Eric, who is currently playing for the Florida Panthers, also played for (and captained) the Hurricanes until February 28, 2016. The youngest and fourth brother, Jared, made his NHL debut on April 25, 2013, on a line together with Jordan and Eric before retiring in 2017. The second-eldest, Marc, currently plays defence for the Florida Panthers.

Playing career

Junior

Peterborough Petes
Staal played major junior in the Ontario Hockey League (OHL) with the Peterborough Petes for two seasons, beginning in 2004–05 after having been selected third overall in the 2004 OHL Priority Draft. In his second year with the club, he produced at a point-per-game pace with 28 goals and 68 points in 68 games before adding 16 points in the playoffs to help lead Peterborough to the J. Ross Robertson Cup as OHL champions. Earning a berth in the 2006 Memorial Cup, the Petes did not, however, make it past the round-robin. During the course of the 2005–06 season, Staal was also selected to play in the 2006 CHL Top Prospects Game.

Going into the 2006 NHL Entry Draft, Staal was ranked second among North American skaters by the NHL Central Scouting Bureau, behind Erik Johnson of the University of Minnesota Golden Gophers. He went on to be drafted second overall by the Pittsburgh Penguins, behind Johnson, who was selected by the St. Louis Blues. Jordan became the third among the four Staal brothers to be drafted into the NHL after his older brothers Marc and Eric, who was also selected second overall.

Professional

Pittsburgh Penguins (2006–2012)
Staal was signed to a three-year, entry-level contract by the Penguins on October 2, 2006, and made the immediate jump from junior to the NHL in 2006–07 at the age of 18. He scored his first NHL goal on October 12, a shorthanded breakaway marker against New York Rangers goaltender Henrik Lundqvist in a 6–5 win. Later that month, on October 21, Staal set a pair of NHL records with a two-goal effort against the Columbus Blue Jackets. In addition to becoming the youngest player to record a two-goal game since Bep Guidolin of the Boston Bruins did so at the age of 18 years and 12 days on December 21, 1943, Staal also scored both his goals on the penalty kill, becoming the youngest player to record two shorthanded goals in one game (surpassing Radek Dvořák of the Florida Panthers, who did so at 20 years and 278 days on December 12, 1997). Having scored his second shorthanded marker on a penalty shot, Staal additionally became the youngest player to score on a penalty shot, surpassing Nathan Horton, who scored with Florida at 18 years and 224 days on January 8, 2004.

Early in Staal's rookie season, however, there was still speculation that he would be returned to his junior team before playing his 10th game to avoid allowing him to accrue a full season under the NHL's collective bargaining agreement. Due to his strong play, however, particularly on the penalty-kill, the Penguins chose to keep him for the remainder of the season. Staal, along with fellow rookie Evgeni Malkin joined superstar Sidney Crosby, who had himself only entered his second NHL season, and goaltender Marc-André Fleury to form an effective young nucleus that revived the Penguins franchise.

In January 2007, Staal participated in the NHL YoungStars Game during the All-Star festivities, along with teammates Ryan Whitney and Malkin. Shortly thereafter, on February 10, 2007, Staal scored his first NHL career hat trick against the Toronto Maple Leafs and set yet another NHL record by becoming the youngest player in league history to score a hat trick at 18 years and 153 days. His first goal came at 19:22 in the first period, the second came at 3:32 in the second, and his third was the game winner, as he beat Toronto goalie Andrew Raycroft stick-side at 3:54 in overtime. The previous mark had been held for over sixty years by Jack Hamilton, who achieved a four-goal game at 18 years and 185 days old with the Maple Leafs against the New York Rangers on December 4, 1943. Then, late in the season, on March 6, Staal scored his league-leading seventh shorthanded goal of the season to break the previous league record for shorthanded tallies by a rookie, set by Gerry Minor of the Vancouver Canucks in 1980–81 and matched by John Madden in 1999–2000. The goal cued a late third period comeback for the Penguins to win 5–4 in a shootout against the Ottawa Senators.

Staal completed his rookie season with 29 goals, second in rookie goal-scoring to teammate Malkin, and 42 points for a Calder Memorial Trophy nomination. The award was given to Malkin, while Staal finished third in voting, behind first runner-up Paul Stastny of the Colorado Avalanche. Staal also joined Malkin and Stastny on the NHL All-Rookie Team.

The next season, in 2007–08, however, Staal's production suffered a setback, managing just 12 goals and 28 points. Regardless, he was an integral part of the Penguins' 2008 playoff run to the Stanley Cup Finals against the Detroit Red Wings. Playing in the semi-finals against the Philadelphia Flyers, Staal briefly left the Penguins to attend his grandfather's funeral during the series, but returned for a two-goal game four effort, in which he cued a near-comeback in the third period to cut the Flyers lead to 3–2. The Penguins were eventually defeated 4–2, but managed to eliminate the Flyers the following game. As the Penguins made their first Stanley Cup Final appearance since 1992, the last time they won the Stanley Cup, they were defeated in six games by the Red Wings. Staal contributed 6 goals and 1 assist during the playoff run.

Early in the 2008–09 season, the Penguins and Red Wings met for the first time since the Stanley Cup series on November 11, 2008. With the Penguins down by three goals in the third period, Staal notched his second career NHL hat trick to tie the game, then set up Ruslan Fedotenko's overtime winner to defeat the Red Wings 7–6. On December 2, 2008, he was named to the rotating position of alternate captain for the Penguins for the month of December. The following month, on January 8, 2009, the Penguins announced that they had extended Staal's contract through the 2012–13 season. Terms of the contract were for $16 million, payable as $3.5 million for the first two seasons, and then $4.5 million for the last two years, resulting in a $4 million salary cap hit. He completed the season bouncing back from the decreased production of his sophomore year with a career-high 27 assists and 49 points. On June 12, 2009, Staal and the Penguins won the Stanley Cup when they defeated the Detroit Red Wings 2–1 at the Joe Louis Arena. Staal had two goals and an assist in the seven-game series, and scored a shorthanded goal that was a pivotal point in Game 4 of the series.

At the end of the regular season, Staal was named as one of the three finalists for the Selke Trophy along with Pavel Datsyuk and Ryan Kesler, awarded annually to the best defensive forward in the league. On April 30, 2010, Staal injured his right leg after his foot was sliced by Montreal Canadiens defenceman P. K. Subban's skate. He had to undergo surgery to repair a torn tendon on top of his big toe. During this injury, Staal ended up missing Game 2 of the Eastern Conference Semi-finals against the Canadiens, the first game Staal had missed in a Penguins uniform since his rookie season – a streak of 358 consecutive games played including the playoffs.

Staal missed the entire first month of October, still recovering from foot surgery. Then, on November 1, just two days before he was to make his season debut, he was struck by a puck in practice, fracturing his hand and sidelining him again for surgery. Staal finally made his season debut at the NHL Winter Classic on January 1, 2011.

On April 18, 2012, Staal registered his first playoff hat trick against the Philadelphia Flyers in a 10–3 victory at the Wells Fargo Center. He would finish the series with six goals as the Penguins lost to the Flyers in six games, their second consecutive first-round playoff exit.

Carolina Hurricanes (2012–present)

On June 22, 2012, Staal was traded to the Carolina Hurricanes in exchange for Brandon Sutter, Brian Dumoulin and the Hurricanes' eighth overall pick at the 2012 NHL Entry Draft (which the Penguins used to select Derrick Pouliot). On July 1, 2012, Staal signed a ten-year, $60 million extension with the Hurricanes. He had received exactly the same offer from the Pittsburgh Penguins, but declined it.

On September 23, 2014, Staal broke his right leg in a pre-season game against the Buffalo Sabres. In November 2016, Staal was diagnosed with a concussion. At the time of his injury, he had recorded five goals and nine points in 21 games.

Staal, along with Justin Faulk, was named co-captain of the Hurricanes, on October 5, 2017. At the conclusion of the 2017–18 season, Staal was named a finalist for the Bill Masterton Memorial Trophy.

In December 2018, Staal was diagnosed with a concussion and was placed on long-term injury reserve (LTIR). At the time of his injury, he had recorded five goals and six assists in 27 games. He was activated from LTIR on February 23, 2019. During that season, the Hurricanes qualified for the 2019 Stanley Cup playoffs but lost in the Eastern Conference Final.

On September 29, 2019, Staal was named captain of the Hurricanes, replacing Justin Williams.

On April 12, 2021, Staal played in his 1,000th NHL game.

International play

Staal made his international debut with Team Canada at the 2007 World Championships in Moscow. Named to the team following the Penguins' first-round playoff defeat, he joined brother Eric to help Canada capture the gold medal by defeating Finland 4–2 in the final. In nine games, Staal contributed two assists.

Personal life

Born the third of four boys in Thunder Bay, Ontario, Staal grew up playing ice hockey with his three brothers on an outdoor rink built by their father Henry. All of the Staal brothers have played in the NHL. Older brothers Eric, drafted by the Carolina Hurricanes in 2003, and Marc, drafted by the New York Rangers in 2005, both play with Jordan in the NHL, while younger brother Jared was drafted in 2008 by the Phoenix Coyotes, has played 2 NHL games and is currently an assistant coach with OHA Edmonton of the Canadian Sport School Hockey League. His cousin Jeff Heerema was drafted by the Hurricanes in the first round of the 1998 NHL Entry Draft.

Before becoming teammates in Carolina, Jordan and Eric have played together on one occasion prior, as part of Team Canada's 2007 World Championship gold medal-winning team, while also competing against each other in the NHL, including their high-profile matchup in the 2009 Eastern Conference Finals. He has also met Marc's New York Rangers in the 2008 playoffs. Jordan has eliminated his brothers with the Penguins in both instances. Jordan has become the second brother to win a Stanley Cup (Pittsburgh 2009) behind older brother Eric (Carolina 2006).

In the summer of 2007, Jordan was arrested at Eric's bachelor party. Both were charged with misdemeanor disorderly conduct and obstructing the legal process, while spending the night in jail. Jordan was also cited with underage drinking.

On June 22, 2012, Staal married longtime girlfriend Heather Dysievick. The couple has three daughters and a son. Their youngest daughter was delivered stillborn on February 22, 2018, a tragedy that made him miss three games.

Staal is a Christian. Staal has said, “Hockey was my identity. Sure, it pushed me to be the player I was, but it still left me empty. I made the NHL and won that Stanley Cup with Pittsburgh, fulfilling all the dreams I could ever think of, but I remember waking up a week later and realizing, ‘that’s it?’... Hockey is an unbelievable sport and something that has obviously been a big part of my life, but it's not all me; it's not something I live for. I live for God, and hockey is definitely something that I want to give God the glory for.”

Career statistics

Regular season and playoffs

International

Awards

OHL All-Star – 2006
Played in CHL Top Prospects Game – 2006
Shared Pittsburgh Penguins Michel Brière Rookie of the Year Award with Evgeni Malkin – 2007
Calder Memorial Trophy finalist – 2007
NHL All-Rookie Team – 2007
Pittsburgh Penguins Player's Player Award – 2010
Frank J. Selke Trophy finalist – 2010
Stanley Cup with the Pittsburgh Penguins – 2009
Carolina Hurricanes Steve Chiasson Award 2014–2015, 2017–2018, 2020–21

Records 
NHL record; youngest player to score two shorthanded goals in one game – October 21, 2006, against the Columbus Blue Jackets (surpassed Radek Dvořák of the Florida Panthers; 20 years, 278 days on December 12, 1997)
NHL record; youngest player to score on a penalty shot – (surpassed Nathan Horton of the Florida Panthers; 18 years, 224 days on January 8, 2004)
NHL record; youngest player to score a hat trick – February 10, 2007, against the Toronto Maple Leafs (surpassed Jack Hamilton of the Toronto Maple Leafs; 18 years, 185 days old on December 4, 1943)
 NHL record; most short-handed goals by a rookie, in 2006–07 (7 shorthanded goals; surpassed Gerry Minor of the Vancouver Canucks in 1980–81 and John Madden in 1999–2000; 6 shorthanded goals)

References

External links
 

1988 births
Canadian ice hockey centres
Canadian people of Dutch descent
Carolina Hurricanes players
Ice hockey people from Ontario
Living people
National Hockey League first-round draft picks
Peterborough Petes (ice hockey) players
Pittsburgh Penguins draft picks
Pittsburgh Penguins players
Sportspeople from Thunder Bay
Jordan
Stanley Cup champions
Canadian expatriate ice hockey players in the United States